Scatella picea is a species of shore flies (insects in the family Ephydridae).

References

Ephydridae
Articles created by Qbugbot
Insects described in 1849